Friendly is a neighborhood in south central Eugene, Oregon, United States. It is represented by the neighborhood association Friendly Area Neighbors.

The neighborhood is named for Friendly Street, which in turn takes its name from Sam Friendly, a 19th-century mayor of the city. The area is home to more than 7,000 residents, and includes Civic Stadium, Westmoreland Park, Madison Meadow, and the western half of Amazon Park. The neighborhood directly adjoins Eugene's downtown area.

References

External links
Friendly Area Neighbors web site

Neighborhoods in Eugene, Oregon